Central Sericultural Research and Training Institute, established in 1943, is a research institute located at Mysore,  Karnataka. It is a constituent unit of Indian Silk Board, Ministry of Textiles, Government of India.

References

External links
csrtiber.res.in

Universities and colleges in Murshidabad district
Colleges affiliated to University of Kalyani
Multidisciplinary research institutes
Educational institutions established in 1943
1943 establishments in India
Research institutes in West Bengal